Military occupation, also known as belligerent occupation or simply occupation, is the effective military control by a ruling power over a territory that is outside of that power's sovereign territory. The territory is then known as the occupied territory and the ruling power the occupant. Occupation is distinguished from annexation and colonialism by its intended temporary duration. While an occupant may set up a formal military government in the occupied territory to facilitate its administration, it is not a necessary precondition for occupation.

The rules of occupation are delineated in various international agreements, primarily the Hague Convention of 1907, the Geneva Conventions of 1949, as well as established state practice. The relevant international conventions, the International Committee of the Red Cross (ICRC) Commentaries, and other treaties by military scholars provide guidelines on such topics as rights and duties of the occupying power, protection of civilians, treatment of prisoners of war, coordination of relief efforts, issuance of travel documents, property rights of the populace, handling of cultural and art objects, management of refugees, and other concerns which are very important both before and after the cessation of hostilities. A country that establishes an occupation and violates internationally agreed upon norms runs the risk of censure, criticism, or condemnation. In the current era, the practices of occupations have largely become a part of customary international law, and form a part of the laws of war.

Occupation and the laws of war

From the second half of the 18th century onwards, international law has come to distinguish between the occupation of a country and territorial acquisition by invasion and annexation, the difference between the two being originally expounded upon by Emerich de Vattel in The Law of Nations (1758). The clear distinction has been recognized among the principles of international law since the end of the Napoleonic wars in the 19th century. These customary laws of occupation which evolved as part of the laws of war gave some protection to the population under the occupation of a belligerent power.

The Hague Convention of 1907 codified these customary laws, specifically within "Laws and Customs of War on Land" (Hague IV); October 18, 1907: "Section III Military Authority over the territory of the hostile State". The first two articles of that section state:
Art. 42.
Territory is considered occupied when it is actually placed under the authority of the hostile army.
The occupation extends only to the territory where such authority has been established and can be exercised.

Art. 43.
The authority of the legitimate power having in fact passed into the hands of the occupant, the latter shall take all the measures in his power to restore, and ensure, as far as possible, public order and safety, while respecting, unless absolutely prevented, the laws in force in the country.

In 1949 these laws governing occupation of an enemy state's territory were further extended by the adoption of the Fourth Geneva Convention (GCIV). Much of GCIV is relevant to protected persons in occupied territories and Section III: Occupied territories is a specific section covering the issue.

Article 6 restricts the length of time that most of GCIV applies:
The present Convention shall apply from the outset of any conflict or occupation mentioned in Article 2.
In the territory of Parties to the conflict, the application of the present Convention shall cease on the general close of military operations.
In the case of occupied territory, the application of the present Convention shall cease one year after the general close of military operations; however, the Occupying Power shall be bound, for the duration of the occupation, to the extent that such Power exercises the functions of government in such territory, by the provisions of the following Articles of the present Convention: 1 to 12, 27, 29 to 34, 47, 49, 51, 52, 53, 59, 61 to 77, 143.

GCIV emphasised an important change in international law. The United Nations Charter (June 26, 1945) had prohibited war of aggression (See articles 1.1, 2.3, 2.4) and GCIV Article 47, the first paragraph in Section III: Occupied territories, restricted the territorial gains which could be made through war by stating:
Protected persons who are in occupied territory shall not be deprived, in any case or in any manner whatsoever, of the benefits of the present Convention by any change introduced, as the result of the occupation of a territory, into the institutions or government of the said territory, nor by any agreement concluded between the authorities of the occupied territories and the Occupying Power, nor by any annexation by the latter of the whole or part of the occupied territory.
Article 49 prohibits the forced mass movement of people out of or into occupied state's territory:
Individual or mass forcible transfers, as well as deportations of protected persons from occupied territory to the territory of the Occupying Power or to that of any other country, occupied or not, are prohibited, regardless of their motive. ... The Occupying Power shall not deport or transfer parts of its own civilian population into the territory it occupies.

Protocol I (1977): "Protocol Additional to the Geneva Conventions of 12 August 1949, and relating to the Protection of Victims of International Armed Conflicts" has additional articles which cover occupation but many countries including the U.S. are not signatory to this additional protocol.

In the situation of a territorial cession as the result of war, the specification of a "receiving country" in the peace treaty merely means that the country in question is authorized by the international community to establish civil government in the territory.   The military government of the principal occupying power will continue past the point in time when the peace treaty comes into force, until it is legally supplanted.

"Military government continues until legally supplanted" is the rule, as stated in Military Government and Martial Law, by William E. Birkhimer, 3rd edition 1914.

Beginning of the occupation

Article 42 of the 1907 Hague Convention on Land Warfare specifies that a "[t]erritory is considered occupied when it is actually placed under the authority of the hostile army." The form of administration by which an occupying power exercises government authority over occupied territory is called military government. Neither the Hague Conventions nor the Geneva Conventions specifically define or distinguish an act of "invasion". Article 2 of the Geneva Conventions expanded on this to include situations in which no armed resistance is encountered.

There does not have to be a formal announcement of the beginning of a military government, nor is there any requirement of a specific number of people to be in place, for an occupation to commence. Birkhimer writes:
No proclamation of part of the victorious commander is necessary to the lawful inauguration and enforcement of military government. That government results from the fact that the former sovereignty is ousted, and the opposing army now has control. Yet the issuing such proclamation is useful as publishing to all living in the district occupied those rules of conduct which will govern the conqueror in the exercise of his authority. Wellington, indeed, as previously mentioned, said that the commander is bound to lay down distinctly the rules according to which his will is to be carried out. But the laws of war do not imperatively require this, and in very many instances it is not done. When it is not, the mere fact that the country is militarily occupied by the enemy is deemed sufficient notification to all concerned that the regular has been supplanted by a military government. (pp. 25-26)

The occupying power

The terminology of "the occupying power" as spoken of in the laws of war is most properly rendered as "the principal occupying power", or alternatively as "the occupying power". This is because the law of agency is always available (When the administrative authority for the occupation of particular areas is delegated to other troops, a "principal -- agent" relationship is in effect).

Because the law of agency is a very general pattern, primarily applicable in this case as the means of regulating the relationships between the said "powers", but a question however in which considerations of logistics are sometimes to be taken in consideration, that definition is  not always applicable outside of those contexts which can be analysed by analogy as related to warlording, even though it does relate more generally to all possible types of military coalitions.

In most contexts determined by the application of the defined and modern laws of war, delegation to agencies generally tends to relating to civilian organizations. Juridical considerations like the above remain in the other cases merely consensual between the said powers. For example, in 1948 the U.S. Military Tribunal in Nuremberg states: 

The conqueror is the principal occupying power.

End of occupation

Rule: Occupation continues until legally supplanted.
According to Eyal Benvenisti, occupation can end in a number of ways, such as: "loss of effective control, namely when the occupant is no longer capable of exercising its authority; through the genuine consent of the sovereign (the ousted government or an indigenous one) by the signing of a peace agreement; or by transferring authority to an indigenous government endorsed by the occupied population through referendum and which has received international recognition".

This is explained as follows. 
For the situation where no territorial cession is involved, the occupation ends with the coming into force of the peace settlement.
Example: (1) Japan after WWII. Japan regained its sovereignty with the coming into force of the San Francisco Peace Treaty on April 28, 1952. In other words, a civil government for Japan was in place and functioning as of this date.

In the situation of a territorial cession, there must be a formal peace treaty.  However, the occupation does not end with the coming into force of the peace treaty.   
Example: (1) Puerto Rico after the Spanish–American War. Military government continued in Puerto Rico past the coming into force of the Treaty of Paris of 1898 on April 11, 1899, and only ended on May 1, 1900 with the beginning of Puerto Rico's civil government.
Example: (2) Cuba after the Spanish–American War. Military government continued in Cuba past the coming into force of the Treaty of Paris of 1898 on April 11, 1899, and only ended on May 20, 1902 with the beginning of the Republic of Cuba's civil government.

Hence, at the most basic level, the terminology of "legally supplanted" is interpreted to mean "legally supplanted by a civil government fully recognized by the national (or "federal") government of the principal occupying power".

Examples of occupations

In most wars some territory is placed under the authority of the hostile army. Most occupations end with the cessation of hostilities. In some cases the occupied territory is returned and in others the land remains under the control of the occupying power but usually not as militarily occupied territory. Sometimes the status of presences is disputed by a party to the situation. The largest extending territories under military occupation came into existence as the outcome of World War I and World War II:
Occupied Enemy Territory Administration (OETA), encompassing much of the Middle East during 1917-1920 - separated to French (OETA North) and British (OETA South) domains;
Allied-occupied Germany (1945–49) in the aftermath of World War II

Occupation is usually a temporary phase, preceding either the handing back of the territory, or its annexation. A significant number of post-1945 occupations have lasted more than two decades such as the occupations of Namibia by South Africa and of East Timor by Indonesia as well as the ongoing occupations of Northern Cyprus by Turkey and of Western Sahara by Morocco. One of the world's longest ongoing occupation is Israel's occupation of the West Bank, including East Jerusalem and the Gaza Strip (1967–present). Other prolonging belligerent occupations that have been alleged include the occupation by the United Kingdom of the Falkland Islands/Malvinas (1833–present) which Argentina claims this as sovereign territory, of Tibet by PR China (1950), and of the Hawaii by the United States (1893). The War Report makes no determination as to whether belligerent occupation is occurring in these cases.

The cases of occupation, which took place in the second half of the 20th century are:

Egyptian occupation of Gaza, 1949/59–1967
Indian occupation of Goa, followed by its annexation (1961)
Indonesian occupation of the West New Guinea, followed by its annexation (1963)
Israeli occupation of the Western Golan Heights (1967–81), followed by its annexation (1981)
 Turkish occupation of Northern Cyprus (1974–present)
 Somali occupation of Ogaden in Ethiopia (1977–1978)
 Indonesian occupation of East Timor, followed by the annexation (1975–1999)
 Moroccan occupation of Western Sahara, followed most areas by its annexation (1975)
 Armenian-occupied territories surrounding Nagorno-Karabakh between the First Nagorno-Karabakh War and the 2020 war (1994–2020)
 U.S. occupation of Cuba's Guantánamo Bay (1959–present)

The most recent cases of occupation, which took place in the 21st century are the:
 Gash-Barka Region taken over in 2000 during the Eritrean–Ethiopian War
 Iraq occupied by US during the Iraq War of 2003–2011 (See: Coalition Provisional Authority)
 Parts of Somalia occupied during the Somalia War (2006–2009)
 The Russian occupation of Georgia since 1992/2008 (See: Gori and Poti occupied by Russia during the Russo-Georgian War)
 Occupation parts of Donbass region and Crimea in Ukraine by Russia since 2014, followed by its Crimea annexation in 2014 (See: Russian military intervention in Ukraine, War in Donbas, 2022 Russian invasion of Ukraine)
 Turkish occupation of northern Syria in support of the Syrian opposition since 2016
 United Arab Emirates takeover of Socotra in 2018 during the Yemeni Civil War

See also
 Banana Wars
 Allied-occupied Germany
 Ex parte Milligan
 German-occupied Europe
 Intervention (international law)
 Interventionism (politics)
 Police action
 Rule of Law in Armed Conflicts Project
 List of countries with overseas military bases
 Lists of military installations
 List of military occupations

References

Further reading
 Simon Collard-Wexler. 2013. Understanding Resistance to Foreign Occupation. PhD thesis, Columbia University. 
Occupied territory - the legal issues, legal provisions regarding occupation of territory by hostile power and implications for people protected by IHL.
  David Kretzmer, Occupation of Justice: The Supreme Court of Israel and the Occupied Territories. State University of New York Press, 2002. ; 
 Sander D. Dikker Hupkes, What Constitutes Occupation? Israel as the occupying power in the Gaza Strip after the Disengagement, Leiden: Jongbloed 2008, 110 pages,   Openacces
 Belligerent Occupation
 The Law of Belligerent Occupation Michal N. Schmitt (regarding occupation of Iraq)
 Law of Belligerent Occupation, Judge Advocate General's School, United States Army
Military Government and Martial Law, by William E. Birkhimer, third edition, revised (1914), Kansas City, Missouri, Franklin Hudson Publishing Co.
 FM 27-10 "The Law of Land Warfare," DEPARTMENT OF THE ARMY, WASHINGTON 25, D.C., 18 July 1956. (This manual supersedes FM 27–10, 1 October 1940, including C 1, 15 November 1944. Changes required on 15 July 1976, have been incorporated within this document.) Chapter 6, OCCUPATION FM 27-10 Chptr 6 Occupation
 Bellal, A. (editor). (2015) The war report: Armed conflict in 2014. United Kingdom: Oxford University Press.

External links

Occupation Studies Research Network - Interdisciplinary hub for the global community of scholars working on military occupation

 
.
Occupation